The 1993–94 Los Angeles Kings season, was the Kings' 27th season in the National Hockey League. It involved Wayne Gretzky becoming the all-time leading goal scorer.

Offseason

NHL Draft

In the Entry Draft, the Kings first pick, in the second round, was used to choose Shayne Toporowski from the Prince Albert Raiders of the Western Hockey League. Their first-round pick had been dealt to the Edmonton Oilers in the Wayne Gretzky trade.

Wayne Gretzky's goal scoring record
 March 20, 1994 – At 19:11 of the third period in a game against the San Jose Sharks, Wayne Gretzky scored the 801st goal of his career, tying his idol, Gordie Howe's record for the NHL's all-time leading goal scorer in a 6-6 tie.
 March 23, 1994 – At 14:47 of the second period in a game against the Vancouver Canucks, Wayne Gretzky scored the 802nd goal of his career. With that goal, Gretzky became the NHL's all-time leading goal scorer, breaking Howe's record. Unfortunately, it would come in a losing effort as the Canucks won the game 6-3.

Regular season

Final standings

Schedule and results

Player statistics

Regular season
Scoring

Goaltending

Playoffs
The Kings missed the playoffs for the first time since 1986, despite making it to the Stanley Cup Finals the previous year.

Awards and honors
Wayne Gretzky, Art Ross Trophy
Wayne Gretzky, Lester Patrick Trophy

Transactions
The Kings were involved in the following transactions during the 1993–94 season.

Trades

Free agent signings

Lost in expansion draft

References
Sources
 Kings on Hockey Database
Notes

Los Angeles Kings seasons
LS
LS
LA Kings
LA Kings